On 11 May 2021, a school shooting occurred in Kazan, Tatarstan, in the western part of Russia, and a bomb was detonated. Nine people (seven 8th-grade students and two teachers) were murdered, and 23 others were injured. The 19-year-old shooter, Ilnaz Galyaviev, was identified as a former student. He pleaded guilty to the murder of two or more persons on 12 May and is being detained.

Events 
The mass shooting occurred at  No. 175, a school in Kazan, Tatarstan, Russia, which had 714 students and 70 employees present at the time. Before the shooting, Ilnaz Galyaviev had visited the school unarmed, but was not allowed in. At  , Galyaviev was stopped at the main entrance by a security system requiring a card. Galyaviev opened fire when the person on guard attempted to stop him from entering. The wounded guard managed to press a panic button at 9:25, triggering an alarm in the school and alerting law enforcement. The alarm alerted teachers in the building, allowing them to lock down their classrooms. A radio communication was also sent out in the building, calling for teachers to close their classrooms. 

Next, Galyaviev moved to different classrooms, which were closed due to the radio announcement, and shot at people in the halls, killing a teacher. He also attempted to shoot a student, but the firearm had run out of ammunition so instead he decided to melee the student. Galyaviev then set off an improvised explosive device near the first-floor English-language room before moving to the second floor, reloading his weapon in a bathroom. Galyaviev then moved to the third floor, going into classroom 310 and killing seven students and a second teacher, and wounding a third. Up to 17 shots were fired during the shooting. Galyaviev then moved to different classrooms on the third floor, all of which were locked. Galyaviev, now having run out of ammunition, attempted to leave the school, just as law enforcement arrived at 9:33. The school was evacuated within twenty minutes.

Video footage inside and outside the school was posted to social media; it appeared to show students using classroom windows to escape, school corridors littered with personal belongings, and a man detained by police.

Firefighters rescued 23 people on the third floor of the school.

Victims 
Nine people were killed during the shooting: seven were eighth-grade students and two were teachers. One student of the school committed suicide in the aftermath of the shooting.

The injured were 20 students ranging from 7 to 15 years old and three adults. At least seven wounded students were hospitalized with gunshot wounds. A Ministry of Emergency Situations Ilyushin Il-76 transported nine injured, including five students, from Kazan to Zhukovsky. After landing, the injured were transferred in ambulances to Moscow. One student was put on an artificial ventilator after surgery.

Perpetrator 

Ilnaz Renatovich Galyaviev (born 11 September 2001), a 19-year-old resident of Kazan, was detained. Galyaviev graduated from Gymnasia No. 175 in 2017 and was expelled from the University of TISBI, a management academy in Kazan, in April 2021. He had no previous criminal record. On the morning of the shooting, Galyaviev posted a photo on Telegram of himself in a face mask with the word 'God' in Russian written on it, captioned, "Today I will kill a huge amount of biowaste and shoot myself." 

Galyaviev had planned for the shooting to take place on 6 May. However, a non-working day was declared by President Putin, which closed the school until 11 May.

A psychological and psychiatric mental evaluation of Galyaviev is planned which will take at least two months. Galyaviev had previously sought mental health treatment and testing revealed some cerebral atrophy a year before the shooting, though he was not registered with a psychiatrist. Relatives had also noticed an increase in Galyaviev's aggressive behavior. However, while in court on 12 May, Galyaviev denied having any serious illnesses.

The Hatsan Escort PS Guard semi-automatic shotgun reportedly used by Galyaviev was officially registered on 14 April, two days after Galyaviev received a permit to carry weapons. In addition, Galyaviev researched bomb recipes on the Internet. He made two bombs, leaving one in his apartment and bringing the second to the school.  

While in custody, Galyaviev said he planted a bomb at his registered address. However, during a search of the location, no explosives were found, and evidence was taken.

Legal proceedings 
On 12 May, Galyaviev pleaded guilty to the murder of two or more persons (Criminal Code of Russia, Article 105, Part 2), which carries a sentence of life imprisonment. He was also taken into detention until 11 July. On 21 July, mass media reported that he was declared insane, but the Investigative Committee of Russia refuted this information; officially his examination will be finished by 26 July.

Aftermath 

All second-shift classes in Kazan were cancelled, and the entrances to Kazan schools were restricted. Several schools in Moscow were searched with dogs, although nothing was found. All students who attend Gymnasia No. 175 are planned to return to school on 17 May in neighboring schools while the school undergoes repairs. After their arrival at the school, a counter-terrorism operation (CTO) regime was established. It was later removed at 15:47. In addition, 12 May was declared a day of mourning. Cultural and entertainment events were cancelled for 11 and 12 May.

Tatarstan authorities sent a 1 million rubles (US$) payment to each family of the deceased. Six victims with major bodily harm have received 400 thousand rubles (US$) each, with plans to send payments of between 200–400 thousand rubles to more families of the injured. In addition, the Russian Red Cross Society raised 62,777,390 rubles (US$) for the victims of the shooting.

Gun control proposals 
President Vladimir Putin expressed condolences to the relatives of the victims and ordered the government to tighten the country's gun laws. Vasily Piskarev, chairman of the State Duma Committee on Security and Anti-Corruption, said a draft bill for tougher restrictions on obtaining a gun license would be considered on 12 May by a working group and that the bill could be considered in the first reading by the State Duma on 18 May. The bill, which was submitted to the State Duma in December 2020, prohibits citizens with two or more convictions, or citizens who have been caught drunk driving, from receiving a license to own weapons.

Secretary of the General Council of United Russia, Andrey Turchak, stressed the need to toughen legislation on gun trafficking and find better approaches to protect schools. State Duma Chairman Vyacheslav Volodin expressed the need for a procedure to prevent unstable citizens from obtaining weapons. He also expressed the need for tougher responsibility on those who distribute false certificates to obtain weapons.

Human Rights ombudsman Tatyana Moskalkova proposed raising the age to obtain a weapon to 21.

Director of the National Guard of Russia, Viktor Zolotov, proposed a mandatory psychological test when receiving a permit for a firearm. He also proposed raising the age to obtain a permit to 21.

Other legislation 
Volodin said the shooting introduced the need to discuss anonymity on the internet in order to reduce extremist and violent content.

See also 
 Kerch Polytechnic College massacre
 Perm State University shooting
 Izhevsk school shooting
 List of massacres in Russia
 List of school massacres by death toll

References

External links 
 

2021 mass shootings in Europe
2020s building bombings
2021 murders in Russia
School shooting
21st-century mass murder in Russia
Building bombings in Russia
High school killings in Europe
Improvised explosive device bombings in 2021
Mass murder in 2021
Mass shootings in Russia
May 2021 crimes in Europe
May 2021 events in Russia
School bombings
School killings in Russia
School shootings in Russia